The Thanon Thong Chai Range (formerly Thanon Range; Burmese Tanen Taunggyi) is a mountain range in northern Thailand. Its tallest peak is Doi Inthanon, the highest point in Thailand. Most of the range is in Chiang Mai Province, with parts in Mae Hong Son and Lamphun Provinces.

Geologically in the Thanon Thong Chai Range, as in the other southern subranges of the Shan Hills, layers of alluvium are superimposed on hard rock. Precambrian rocks are present in this range, but absent in the ranges further east, such as the Khun Tan Range.

Geography
The Thanon Thong Chai Range is the southernmost prolongation of the Shan Hills and it consists of two parallel ranges running southwards from the southwestern limits of the Daen Lao Range between rivers Yuam and Ping. The eastern range is also known as Inthanon Range (ทิวเขาอินทนนท์). Often the Dawna Range further west and south is included as the western part of the Thanon Thong Chai Range. There are also some geographers who include the Thanon Thong Chai as a subrange of the Daen Lao Range.

History
Certain hill tribe communities live in the range, like the Hmong and the Karen whose tribal villages dot the mountainsides. Some of these communities are regularly visited by organized tourist groups.

Doi Inthanon was formerly known as Doi Ang Ka and was renamed in honor of King Inthawichayanon at the end of the 19th century.

Ecology
The vegetation is mostly deciduous forest below  and evergreen hill forest above this height but there has been heavy deforestation. Since a great proportion of the original forest cover has disappeared, denuded patches of grassland and mixed bushy vegetation are common. Some projects for the restoration of forest cover have been undertaken in ecologically degraded areas.

Animal species in the Thanon Thong Chai Range are threatened by deliberate wildfires that are set seasonally by farmers in different areas across the range. Wild fauna in the range includes Sambar deer, barking deer, serow, leopard, goral and the Tenasserim white-bellied rat, as well as many bird species. A number of national parks and wildlife sanctuaries are found in the range.

Protected areas

Doi Inthanon National Park
Doi Suthep-Pui National Park
Khun Khan National Park
Mae Ngao National Park
Mae Ping National Park
Mae Tho National Park
Mae Wang National Park
Namtok Mae Surin National Park
Op Luang National Park
Op Khan National Park
Chiang Dao Wildlife Sanctuary
Lum Nam Pai Wildlife Sanctuary
Mae Lao-Mae Sae Wildlife Sanctuary
Mae Tuen Wildlife Sanctuary
Om Koi Wildlife Sanctuary

See also
Deforestation in Thailand
Doi Inthanon
Western Forest Complex
Thai highlands

References

External links

Google Books, The Physical Geography of Southeast Asia
Doi Inthanon - Climbing Thailand's Highest Mountain
Peakbagger - Shan-Western Thailand
Doi Mae Ta Man

 
Shan Hills
Mountain ranges of Thailand
Mountain ranges of Myanmar
Geography of Chiang Mai province
Geography of Lamphun province
Geography of Mae Hong Son province